Aalborg Airport railway station is a railway station serving Aalborg Airport near the city of Aalborg in North Jutland, Denmark.

The station is the terminus of the Aalborg Airport railway line which links Aalborg Airport with the city of Aalborg. The station opened in December 2020 with the opening of the railway line. The train services are operated by the railway company DSB which runs frequent train services between from Aalborg Airport to Nørresundby and Aalborg with onwards connections to the rest of Denmark.

References

External links

 Aalborg Airport
 Banedanmark – government agency responsible for maintenance and traffic control of most of the Danish railway network
 DSB – largest Danish train operating company
 Danske Jernbaner – website with information on railway history in Denmark
 Nordjyllands Jernbaner – website with information on railway history in North Jutland

Airport railway stations in Denmark
Railway stations in the North Jutland Region
Railway stations opened in 2020
2020 establishments in Denmark
Buildings and structures in Aalborg Municipality
Railway stations in Denmark opened in the 21st century